Amaranatha Jha (25 February 1897  – 2 September 1955) was the Vice Chancellor (VC) of the University of Allahabad and the Banaras Hindu University. He was the son of Mahamahopadhyay Dr. Sir Ganganath Jha, a great scholar of Sanskrit Amaranatha Jha  was reputed as the ablest professor of English literature in India of his time. He was Head of the Department of English at the University of Allahabad for a long time, being appointed to the post at the young age of thirty-two.  He succeeded his father as Vice-Chancellor of the Allahabad University of the Banaras Hindu University in succession to Dr. Radhakrishnan.
He worked as  Vice Chairman of the committee for the project leading to the establishment of the National Defence Academy. He was one amongst eminent dignitaries associated with the Rashtriya Sanskrit Sanstahan, Allahabad. At the end of his academic career, he was made the Chairman of the Bihar Public Service Commission (1 April 1953 – 1 September 1955).

Honours
In 1910-11 the Muir Hostel was constructed. Allahabad University renamed it as "Amarnath Jha Hostel" to pay him regards. hostels' history say that Dr. Amarnath Jha as Vice-Chancellor of the University of Allahabad was himself also the warden of the Muir Hostel.
He was among the first recipients of the civilian honour of Padma Bhushan (1954).

Personal life
Dr. Amarnath Jha was born in a Maithil Shrotriya Brahmin family of Mithila ( Sarisab-Pahi ) in Bihar. He died at an early age of fifty nine on 2 September 1955 at Patna. 
Dr. Amarnath Jha was a great scholar,  a consummate speaker and an administrator par excellence.

References

External links
University of Allahabad official webpage
Banaras Hindu University Official webpage

Scholars from Bihar
University of Allahabad alumni
Vice Chancellors of Banaras Hindu University
Recipients of the Padma Bhushan in literature & education
1947 deaths
Year of birth uncertain
Indian Sanskrit scholars
20th-century Indian scholars
1890s births